WAMY is a classic country radio formatted broadcast radio station licensed to Amory, Mississippi, serving Amory and Monroe County, Mississippi. WAMY is owned and operated by Stanford Communications, Inc.

FM translator
An FM translator simulcasts the main station; the translator affords the listener the ability to listen on FM with its inherent high fidelity sound. The FM translator may also improve coverage, especially at night when the AM station broadcasts with only 18 watts.

External links

AMY
Classic country radio stations in the United States